The Anatolian rock lizard (Anatololacerta anatolica) is a species of lizard in the family Lacertidae. It is found in western Anatolia and on islands off the coast, where its natural habitats are temperate forests and rocky areas. A common species, the IUCN has listed it as being of "least concern".

Description
The head and body are somewhat flattened and the markings rather variable. The basal colour is dark olive-brown and there are usually two series of pale dorso-lateral spots which may merge into each other forming lines. The areas between these stripes have further pale speckling. The throat may be reddish but the rest of the underparts are pale, sometimes with a few dark spots on the flanks. Lizards on Icaria have particularly bold, contrasting markings.

Distribution and habitat
The Anatolian rock lizard is endemic to western Anatolia (Asia Minor) north of the Büyük Menderes River and to islands close to the coast, some of which are Turkish and others Greek. It is present on Samos, Icaria, Nisyros, Symi, Strongyli Megistis, Rhodes and Pentanisios. It is often present in rocky areas in woodland and near streams in otherwise arid locations. Females lay clutches of three to eight eggs.

Status
The species has a wide range and is generally common. The population is large and stable and the main threat it faces are wildfires. The International Union for Conservation of Nature has assessed its conservation status as being of "least concern".

References

Anatololacerta
Reptiles of Turkey
Reptiles described in 1902
Taxa named by Franz Werner
Taxonomy articles created by Polbot